Senator Atkinson may refer to:

Archibald Atkinson (1792–1872), Virginia State Senate
Jason Atkinson (born 1970), Oregon State Senate
Kelvin Atkinson (born 1969), Nevada State Senate
Robert Jones Atkinson (1820–1871), Ohio State Senate